Lightning Lake is a lake in Grant County, in the U.S. state of Minnesota.

Lightning Lake probably received its name from an incident when a party of explorers were almost struck by lightning near the lake.

See also
List of lakes in Minnesota

References

Lakes of Minnesota
Lakes of Grant County, Minnesota